Josip Kosmatin (born 1897, date of death unknown) was a Yugoslav cyclist. He competed in two events at the 1924 Summer Olympics.

References

External links
 

1897 births
Year of death missing
Slovenian male cyclists
Yugoslav male cyclists
Olympic cyclists of Yugoslavia
Cyclists at the 1924 Summer Olympics
Sportspeople from Ljubljana